Autreppe is a village of Wallonia and district of the municipality of Honnelles, located in the province of Hainaut, Belgium. A frontier village of the Haut-Pays (highlands), it is crossed by the Hogneau, a stream coming from France and which has the name of Grande Honnelle there, a name it keeps throughout its journey in Belgium.

References

External links 

 

Former municipalities of Hainaut (province)